Ria is a feminine given name. In the West, it is often a short form of Maria. Ria is also an Indonesian name meaning joy or hilarity. People with the name include:

Ria Ahlers (born 1954), Dutch high jumper
Ria Antoniou (born 1988), Greek beauty pageant winner
Ria Atayde (born 1992), Filipina actress
Ria Bancroft (1907–1993), New Zealand sculptor
Ria Baran (1922–1986), West German figure skater
Ria Bartok, stage name of Marie-Louise Pleiss (1943–1970), French pop singer 
Ria Beckers (1938–2006), Dutch GreenLeft politician
Ria Bond (born 1976), New Zealand politician
Ria Brieffies (1957–2009), Dutch singer
Ria Carlo (born 1974), Trinidad-born American pianist, mathematician and model
Ria Cheruvu (born c. 2003), American child prodigy
Ria Cortesio (born 1976), American baseball umpire
Ria Ginster (1898–1985), German soprano
Ria Hall (born c. 1982), New Zealand recording artist and presenter
Ria van der Horst (born 1932), Dutch swimmer
Ria Irawan (1969–2020), Indonesian actress and singer
Ria Jende (1898–1927), Belgian-born German film actress 
Ria Kataja (born 1975), Finnish actress
Ria Keburia, Georgian fashion designer
Ria Lina British comedian, actress, and writer
Ria Mae, (born 1991) Ria MacNutt, Canadian singer and songwriter
Ria Meyburg (born 1939), Dutch artistic gymnast
Ria Mooney (1904–1973), Irish actress, theater director, and acting teacher
Ria Öling (born 1994), Finnish footballer 
Ria Oomen-Ruijten (born 1950), Dutch CDA politician and MEP
Ria Percival (born 1989), New Zealand footballer
Ria Persad (born 1974), Trinidad and Tobago-born American mathematician and a classical musician
Ria Ramnarine (born 1978), Trinidadian boxer
Ria Ritchie (born 1987), English singer-songwriter
Ria Sabay (born 1985), German tennis player
Ria Schiffner (born 1996), German ice dancer
Ria Schwendinger (born 1998), German ice dancer
Ria Sharma (born 1992), Indian social activist
Ria Stalman (born 1951), Dutch discus thrower and shot putter
Ria van Stipdonk (born 1949), Dutch slalom canoeist
Ria Thiele (1904–1996), German actress, dancer and choreographer
Ria Thielsch (born 1951), New Guinea-born Dutch singer and model
Ria Tobing (1938–2017), Indonesian swimmer
Ria Valk (born 1941), Dutch singer
Ria van Dyke (born 1989), New Zealand model and beauty pageant winner
Ria Van Landeghem (born 1957), Belgian long-distance runner
Ria Vandervis (born 1984), New Zealand actress
Ria Vedder-Wubben (1951–2016), Dutch CDA politician
Ria van Veen (1923–1995), Dutch swimmer
Ria van Velsen (born 1939), Dutch artistic gymnast
Ria van Velsen (born 1943), Dutch swimmer
Ria Visser (born 1961), Dutch speed skater
Ria Wägner (1914–1999), Swedish journalist, author, translator, and television producer,
Ria Wolmarans (1950–1996), Botswana murder victim

Dutch feminine given names
Indonesian feminine given names